Queen Adelaide Archipelago is an island group in Zona Austral, the extreme south of Chile. It belongs to the Magallanes y la Antártica Chilena Region.

The major islands in the group are Pacheco Island, Contreras Island, Ramirez Island, Cochrane Island, Juan Guillermos Island and the Rennell Islands (South Rennell Island and North Rennell Island).

See also
List of islands of Chile

 
Archipelagoes of Chile
Archipelagoes of the Pacific Ocean
Islands of Magallanes Region